Dragiša Jovanović (born 23 October 1965) is a Yugoslav bobsledder. He competed in the two man and the four man events at the 1992 Winter Olympics.

References

1965 births
Living people
Yugoslav male bobsledders
Olympic bobsledders of Yugoslavia
Bobsledders at the 1992 Winter Olympics
Place of birth missing (living people)